Luiza Gega (born 5 November 1988) is an Albanian middle- and long-distance runner who specialises in the 3000 metres steeplechase since 2016. She won the silver medal in the event at the 2016 European Championships, and a gold in 2022 setting the championship record in the process. Her silver was the first ever Albania’s European medal, while her gold was the first ever title for the country at the European Athletics Championships.

Gega represented Albania at the 2016 Rio Olympics, and 2020 Tokyo Olympics, competing in the women's 3000 m steeplechase.

She competed at the 2019 World Athletics Championships, finishing ninth, and at the 2022 World Athletics Championships, finishing fifth, both in the 3000 metres steeplechase. In 2022 she became European Champion in that discipline, where previously, in 2016, she had been runner-up.

Gega is the Albanian record holder in the 800, 1500, 3000 (those three out and indoor), 5000, 10,000 metres, half-marathon and marathon distances as well as the 2000 and 3000 metres steeplechase.

Competition record

Personal bests
 800 metres – 2:01.31 (Tbilisi 2014) 
 800 metres indoor – 2:02.27 (Piraeus 2013) 
 1500 metres – 4:02.63 (Doha 2015) 
 1500 metres indoor – 4:06.66 (Istanbul 2017) 
 3000 metres – 8:46.61 (Elbasan 2022) 
 3000 metres indoor – 8:44.46 (Karlsruhe 2020) 
 5000 metres – 15:16.47 (Craiova 2022) 
 10,000 metres – 32:16.25 (Birmingham 2021) 
 2000 metres steeplechase – 6:00.07 (Berlin 2019) 
 3000 metres steeplechase – 9:10.04 (Eugene, OR 2022) 
Road
 10 km – 33:43 (Tirana 2019)
 Half marathon – 1:13:11 (Tirana 2017) 
 Marathon – 2:35:34 (Skopje 2020)

Notes

References

External links
 

1988 births
Living people
Albanian female middle-distance runners
World Athletics Championships athletes for Albania
Female steeplechase runners
Albanian steeplechase runners
Athletes (track and field) at the 2016 Summer Olympics
Olympic athletes of Albania
European Athletics Championships winners
European champions for Albania
Athletes (track and field) at the 2013 Mediterranean Games
Athletes (track and field) at the 2022 Mediterranean Games
Mediterranean Games gold medalists in athletics
Mediterranean Games gold medalists for Albania
Mediterranean Games silver medalists for Albania
Mediterranean Games medalists in athletics
Universiade medalists in athletics (track and field)
Universiade medalists for Albania
European Games competitors for Albania
Athletes (track and field) at the 2015 European Games
Competitors at the 2011 Summer Universiade
Medalists at the 2013 Summer Universiade
Athletes (track and field) at the 2020 Summer Olympics
20th-century Albanian women
21st-century Albanian women